Rincon Heights Historic District is a historic place in Tucson, Arizona.
It is roughly bounded by 6th Street, Broadway Boulevard, Campbell Avenue, and Fremont Avenue.

Rincon Heights was officially listed as a National Historic District in February 2013. The City funded the preparation of the nomination with a grant it obtained from the State Historic Preservation Office, and the nomination was prepared by Dr. Brooks Jeffery from The University of Arizona and his students, who submitted an application for its official designation as a historic district.

References

Historic districts on the National Register of Historic Places in Arizona
Neighborhoods in Tucson, Arizona
Houses in Pima County, Arizona
Houses on the National Register of Historic Places in Arizona
National Register of Historic Places in Tucson, Arizona